This is a list of the five counties in the U.S. state of Rhode Island. Rhode Island is tied with Hawaii for having the second-fewest counties of any U.S. state (only Delaware has fewer, with three counties). Although Rhode Island is divided into counties, it does not have any local government at the county level. Instead, local governance is provided by the eight cities and thirty-one towns. Counties in Rhode Island have had no governmental functions since 1846 other than as court administrative and sheriff corrections boundaries which are part of state government.

Within Rhode Island, Washington County is colloquially referred to as South County.

The colony of Rhode Island was established in the 17th century, and was the first of the thirteen original American colonies to declare independence from British rule in 1776, during the American Revolution, and the last to ratify the Constitution. The counties were all established before the Declaration of Independence.

The Federal Information Processing Standard (FIPS) code, which is used by the United States government to uniquely identify states and counties, is provided with each entry. Rhode Island's code is 44, which when combined with any county code would be written as 44XXX. The FIPS code for each county links to census data for that county.



Alphabetical list

|}

Note
 The county seat of Washington County (before county government was abolished) is often referred to as West Kingston. In reality, West Kingston, a village of South Kingstown, does not have its own local government, but because the courthouse was located in West Kingston's zip code, it has become known as the county seat.

References

Rhode Island, counties in
 
Counties